This article is about the demographic features of the population of Hong Kong, including population density, ethnicity, education level, the health of the populace, religious affiliations, and other aspects of the population.

Hong Kong is one of the most densely populated areas in the world, with an overall density of some 6,300 people per square kilometre. At the same time, Hong Kong has one of the world's lowest birth rates—0.68 per woman of child-bearing age as of 2022, far below the replacement rate of 2.1. It is estimated that 26.8% of the population will be aged 65 or more in 2033, up from 12.1% in 2005. Hong Kong recorded 8.2 births per 1,000 people in 2005–2010.

Ethnically, Hong Kong mainly consists of Chinese who constitute approximately 92% of the population.  Of these, many originate from various regions in Guangdong. There are also a number of descendants of immigrants from elsewhere in Southern China during and after the Chinese Civil War.

Terminology

People from Hong Kong generally refer to themselves, in Cantonese, as Hèung Góng Yàhn; however, the term is not restricted to those of Chinese descent, owing to Hong Kong's roughly 160-year colonial history that saw the civil servants and traders of British, Indian, Russian and other ethnic groups stationed in Hong Kong.

In English, the term 'Hongkongers' (or sometimes 'Hong Kongers') is also used to refer to Hong Kongese people, while the term 'Hongkongese' is sometimes used as an adjective to describe people or things related to Hong Kong.

Population density

The following census data is available for Hong Kong between the years 1841–2011. In 2011, Hong Kong had a population of just over 7 million, with a density of approximately 6,300 people per square kilometer. This makes Hong Kong the fourth most densely populated region in the world, after Macau, Monaco, and Singapore.

Ethnicity

Chinese
Historically, the major Chinese groups in Hong Kong include the Punti, Hakka, Cantonese (including Toishanese), Hoklo, and Tanka. The Punti, and Tanka people in Hong Kong are largely descendants of the indigenous population, while the Hakka and Hoklo groups are composed of both indigenous groups and more recent migrants.

Most Teochew-speaking migrants immigrated to Hong Kong between the late 1940s and early 1970s, while migrants from Fujian (previously Southern Min speakers, and increasingly more Central Min and Northern Min speakers) have constituted a growing number of migrants since 1978. Many Taishanese and Cantonese also migrated after 1949.

According to the 2016 by-census, 92% of the Hong Kong population is ethnic Chinese. The Hong Kong census does not currently categorise Han Chinese subgroups, although in the past the census would collect information on language and dialect use which can be used to ascertain proportions of the population's ethnicity. However, the majority of Hongkongers of Chinese descent trace their ancestry to various parts of Southern China: the Guangzhou area, followed by Siyi (Toishanese people), Chaoshan (a region of Eastern Guangdong home to Teochew speakers), Fujian, and Shanghai. Some Cantonese people also originate from Hakka-speaking villages in the New Territories.

Ethnic minorities
8% of the population of Hong Kong are categorised as "ethnic minorities", including a large number of Filipinos and Indonesians, who together make up approximately 4.6% of the population. However, the majority of the Filipinos and Indonesians population are short-termed foreign domestic helpers. After excluding foreign domestic helpers, the number of ethnic minorities was 263 593 in 2016, making up 3.6% of the whole Hong Kong population.

Circa 2018 there were about 2,000 people of African origins with about 800-1,000 in Yuen Long. Chungking Mansions is another area of settlement and employment. Some Africans seeking to asylum travelled to Hong Kong as of June 2020. According to Lingnan University professor Lisa Leung Yuk-ming, African settlement began in the 1990s. The Hong Kong African Association (香港非洲人協會) is an ethnic association for those people.

A Thai community began in Hong Kong when Thai women travelled with their husbands, of Chaozhou (Chiu Chow) origin, to Hong Kong in the 1970s. In 2016, Hong Kong had about 10,215 Thai residents, with around 33% residing in Kowloon City.

Nationality
Due to its history as trading, business, and tourism hub, a large number of expatriates live in Hong Kong, representing 9.4% of the population. The following lists ethnic groups with significant presence in Hong Kong in alphabetical order by category:

 Africa
 East Asia
 Japan
 Korea
 Europe
 Britain
 France
 Russia
 North America
 America
 Canada
 Oceania
 Australia
 South Asia
India
Nepal
Pakistan
 Southeast Asia
 The Philippines
 Indonesia (mainly Javanese)
 Thailand
 Vietnam

Age groups

United Nations data 
According to United Nations estimates from 1 July 2013, Hong Kong's population is distributed in the following age ranges, with the largest age group represented being 50–54 years:

Population Estimates by Sex and Age Group (01.VII.2020):

Hong Kong government data 
The Hong Kong government provides the following estimates for mid-2013:
 0–14 years: 11.0% (male 408,000; female 382,600)
15–24 years: 11.7% (male 424,500; female 417,900)
25–34 years: 15.2% (male 454,900; female 639,700)
35–44 years: 15.9% (male 471,500; female 671,800)
45–54 years: 17.7% (male 587,900; female 681,700)
55–64 years: 14.2% (male 503,700; female 512,600)
65 and over: 14.3% (male 479,500; female 547,700)

Median age: 45.0 (2013 est.)

Language 

As a former British colony, Hong Kong has 2 official languages: English, and Chinese, although the specific variety of Chinese is not specified. The majority of the population uses Cantonese as their usual spoken language. However, due to Hong Kong's role as an international trade and finance hub, there are also a wide variety of minority groups speaking dozens of languages present in the territory.

However, a very large proportion of the population in Hong Kong are able to communicate in multiple languages. The school system is separated into English-medium and Chinese-medium school, both of which teach English and Mandarin.

Sex ratio 
According to The World Factbook in 2013, the Hong Kong population was divided into the following male/female ratios:

Male/female ratio by age group 
At birth: 1.07 male(s)/female
0–14 years: 1.09 male(s)/female
15–24 years: 1.01 male(s)/female
25–54 years: 0.88 male(s)/female
55–64 years: 1 male(s)/female
65 years and over: 0.88 male(s)/female
Total population: 0.94 male(s)/female

Education level 
According to The World Factbook estimates in 2002, 93.5% of the population over the age of 15 had attended schooling, including 96.9% of males and 89.6% of females.

Health and mortality 
The following table shows birth rates and mortality rates in Hong Kong between 1950 and 2022.

At the end of the 20th century, Hong Kong had one of the lowest birth rates in the world. However, the number of births doubled in the decade between 2001 and 2011, largely due to an increase in the number of children born in Hong Kong to women with residence in Mainland China. In 2001 there were 7,810 births to Mainland women (16%) out of a total of 48,219 births. By 2009 it increased to 37,253 births to Mainland women (45%) out of a total of 82,095 births.

Birth and mortality rates

Infant mortality rate 
According to The World Factbook in 2013, the infant mortality rate in Hong Kong was 2.89 deaths/1,000 live births.

Life expectancy 
According to The World Factbook in 2013, the average life expectancy for the total population was 82.2 years; 79.47 years for males and 85.14 years for females.

Hong Kong is the territory with the world's highest life expectancy according to the United Nations.

Source: UN World Population Prospects

Marriage and fertility 
According to The World Factbook in 2006, the average marriage age in Hong Kong was 30 years for males and 27 years for females, and the population was subdivided into the following categories:

Marital status 
Married: 57.8% (3,423,995)
Never married: 32% (1,920,522)
Divorced: 3.2% (189,563)
Separated: 0.6% (34,722)

Fertility rate 
0,68 (2022)

Religion 

Over half of all people (56.1% as of 2010) are not religious. Religious people in Hong Kong follow a diverse range of religions, among which Taoist and Buddhist (specifically Chinese Buddhism) faiths are common for people of Chinese descent.

Confucian beliefs are popular in Hong Kong, but it is arguable whether Confucianism can be considered as a religion. As such, Confucianism is excluded in some studies.

The Christian beliefs of Protestantism(with 900,000 members) and Catholicism (401,000 members) are also common, as well as non-organised Chinese folk religions, whose followers may state that they are not religious.

Traditional religions including Chinese Buddhism were discouraged under British rule, which officially represented Christianity. The handover of sovereignty from Britain to China has led to a resurgence of Buddhist and Chinese religions.

See also

Hong Kong drifter
Hong Kong Kids phenomenon
Hong Kongers
Hong Kongers in the United Kingdom
Indigenous inhabitants of the New Territories
Right of abode in Hong Kong
Emigration from Hong Kong

References

Further reading

External links
Hong Kong Population History
HK Facts
TopNews.in – Baby boom pushes Hong Kong population above 7 million
Census and Statistics Department – Latest Official HK Population Statistics
Hong Kong African Association (香港非洲人協會)

 
Hong Kong